Joseph or Joe Baker may refer to:

Joseph Baker (Royal Navy officer) (1767–1817), British naval officer
Joseph Baker (pirate) (died 1800), Canadian pirate
Joe Baker (marine scientist) (1932–2018), Australian marine scientist and rugby league player
Joseph Baker (politician) (born 1959), member of the Vermont House of Representatives
Joseph A. Baker, member of the Mississippi State Senate
Joe Baker (1940–2003), England footballer
Joe Baker (footballer, born 1977), English footballer
Joseph Allen Baker (1852–1918), British Member of Parliament for Finsbury East, 1905–19
Joe Don Baker (born 1936), American Hollywood actor
 Joseph M. Baker (1898–1928), U.S. Marine who won the Distinguished Service Cross in World War I
Joe Baker, a member of the Baker family of characters from Resident Evil 7: Biohazard
Joey Baker, an American college basketball player
Joby Baker (Joseph N. Baker), Canadian-born actor and painter

See also
Joe Baker-Cresswell (1901–1997), Royal Navy officer
Jo Baker (disambiguation)